Highways in Estonia are the main transport network in Estonia. The Estonian national classification includes several classes of highways: 
 Main route (põhimaantee) – highway, that connects the capital with other large cities, connects large cities and the capital with major ports, railway points and border crossings.
 Support route (tugimaantee) – highway, that connects towns with other towns and main routes.
 Side route (kõrvalmaantee) – highway, that connects towns with boroughs, connects boroughs and villages and all of the previous with main- and support routes.

Other than these, the national road classification includes the following categories which may also be referred to as highways in a general sense, with decreasing order of priority (and applicability of the term highway):
 Connector road (ühendustee) – constructed for traffic flow on the intersections/interchanges of highways
 Other (muu) – other roads in the list of the Ministry of Economic Affairs and Communications

All roads in Estonia are officially marked with 1–5 digits numbers, with no official prefixes.

In addition to state highways, there are 23 920 km of local roads and around 18 398 km of private and forest roads. The total Estonian road network is estimated to be almost 59 thousand km.

Classification of highways in Estonia 
The technical classification of highways is as follows:
 Motorway (kiirtee) – Paved highway designated for appropriately fast-traveling motor vehicles, that does not service areas directly adjacent to it. A motorway has at least two lanes in each traveling direction, separated physically. The road must intersect with railways or other roads on separate levels. The road is entered and exited via acceleration and deceleration lanes. A road must confine to the motorway standards, when the expected AADT is 30,000.
 I class – Paved highway with at least two lanes in each traveling direction, that intersects with railways or other roads on separate levels. The road is entered and exited via acceleration and deceleration lanes. A road must confine to the I class highway standards, when the expected AADT is 14,500.
 II class – Paved highway, which may intersect with other roads at-grade. A road must confine to the II class highway standards, when the expected AADT is 6,000.
 III class – Paved highway, which may intersect with other roads at-grade. A road must confine to the III class highway standards, when the expected AADT is 3,000.
 IV class – Paved or unpaved highway, which may intersect with other roads at-grade. A road must confine to the IV class highway standards, when the expected AADT is 500.
 V class – Paved or unpaved highway. A road must confine to the V class highway standards, when the expected AADT is 500.
 VI class – Paved or unpaved highway. A road must confine to the VI class highway standards, when the expected AADT is 50.

Main routes

The backbone of the Estonian national route system, national main routes (põhimaanteed) make up a network of 1,602 kilometres of road, amounting to 10% of the total road network. The traffic numbers however make up nearly 50% of the Estonian road network's traffic volumes. The highest AADT's are around Tallinn, on the T1 between Loo and Maardu, on the T2 between Tallinn and Jüri, and on the T4 between Laagri and Kanama (the highest AADT on Estonian national routes at 31,000).
A main route is defined as a highway, that connects the capital with other large cities, connects large cities and the capital with major ports, railway points and border crossings. Currently there are 12 separate main routes. The main routes are marked with 1–2 white digits on a red shield. The speed limits on Estonian main routes are 110 or 120 on 2+2 sections and 90 on regular roads (on newer sections of road, these are adjusted according to conditions by electronic speed limit signs).

The main routes are the only roads with I class highways. The total amount is 186.6 kilometres, found on the T1, T2, T4 and T11. This number will enlarge significantly with further upgrades of the T11 and the T2 between Kose and Mäo to I class highway. There are currently no motorways in Estonia, however 24.4 kilometres of the T2 is restricted-access I class highway.
Ten main routes are a part of TEN-T, six routes are a part of the International E-road network. The routes E263, E67, E20, E264 and E265 run through Estonia.

The highways are maintained by the Estonian Road Administration outside city limits. Inside cities and towns, the roads are maintained by the city government.
The first stationary speed cameras in Estonia were placed on route T2. Currently there are 67 stationary speed cameras on the main routes.

List of main routes

Support routes

Support routes (tugimaanteed) are the second highest classification in the Estonian national route system. They make up a network of 2,405 kilometres of road, amounting to 15% of the total road network. 
A support route is defined as a highway, that connects towns with other towns and main routes. Currently there are 77 separate support routes. The support routes are marked with 2 black digits on a yellow shield. The support roads have no special prefix, as all Estonian roads have the prefix T.

List of support routes

European routes

Estonia is a part of the UNECE, and therefore also has numerous E-roads running through it. The E-roads in Estonia form a network on top of the main routes and are usually signposted on all signs. Currently there are six separate European routes in Estonia.

List of European routes

Former (historical) roads
 Piibe Road (Piibe road)

See also
 Transport in Estonia

References

 
Lists of buildings and structures in Estonia
Lists of roads